Bryan Balsiger (born 2 July 1997) is a Swiss equestrian. He competed in the 2020 Summer Olympics.

References

External links
 

1997 births
Living people
People from Neuchâtel
Equestrians at the 2020 Summer Olympics
Swiss male equestrians
Olympic equestrians of Switzerland
Show jumping riders
Sportspeople from the canton of Neuchâtel
21st-century Swiss people